Lee Soo-kyung (born March 13, 1982) is a South Korean actress.

Career
She debuted as a commercial model in 2003, then began her acting career by doing supporting roles, notably in Tazza: The High Rollers and Dear Heaven, before being cast in her first leading role in the 2006 sitcom Soulmate. Lee became a household name in 2007 after headlining the hit family drama The Golden Age of Daughters-in-Law. After doing the mystery thriller Rainbow Eyes, and holiday movie Romantic Island, Lee returned to television. She has since starred in the romantic comedy Lawyers of the Great Republic of Korea, surrogacy melodrama Loving You a Thousand Times, and political series Daemul.

In April 2018, Lee signed with new management agency Echo Global Group.

Filmography

Television drama

Film

Variety show

Theater

Discography

Awards and nominations

References

External links 

 
 
 
 

Actresses from Seoul
1982 births
Living people
21st-century South Korean actresses
South Korean film actresses
South Korean television actresses
South Korean stage actresses
Dongduk Women's University alumni